Winston-Salem City Hall is a historic city hall located at Winston-Salem, Forsyth County, North Carolina.  It was designed by the architectural firm Northup and O'Brien and built in 1926.  It is a three-story, "U"-shaped Renaissance Revival building. It is a brick building with a first floor of rusticated stone. It has a flat roof with a limestone cornice and balustrade with shaped balusters. The Salem town offices were housed in the Salem Town Hall until consolidation in 1913. The building was renovated in 2000.

It was listed on the National Register of Historic Places in 2001.

History 

The home of D. H. Starbuck and his family originally stood on the site of the current structure.

References

City and town halls on the National Register of Historic Places in North Carolina
Renaissance Revival architecture in North Carolina
Government buildings completed in 1926
Buildings and structures in Winston-Salem, North Carolina
National Register of Historic Places in Winston-Salem, North Carolina
City and town halls in North Carolina